Bourreria is a genus of flowering plants in the borage family, Boraginaceae. Members of the genus are commonly known as strongbark or strongback. The generic name was chosen by Patrick Browne to honour German pharmacist Johann Ambrosius Beurer. The genus is native to the Americas, where species are distributed from Mexico to northern South America, and in the Caribbean and Florida in the United States. The center of diversity is in the Caribbean, Central America, and Mexico.

As of 2007 there are about 30 species in the genus.

Species include: 
Bourreria andrieuxii – guayabillo, lágrima de virgen
 Bourreria baccata Raf.
Bourreria bolivarensis
 Bourreria cassinifolia (A.Rich.) Griseb. – smooth strongbark
Bourreria costaricensis
Bourreria formosa
Bourreria grandicalyx
Bourreria hintonii
Bourreria huanita – huanita, jazmín de palo, jazmín del istmo, guie-xoba
Bourreria longiflora
Bourreria mollis
Bourreria motaguensis
Bourreria obovata
 Bourreria ovata Miers – Bahamian strongbark
Bourreria oxyphylla – bojón, jub a che, palo de nance, taruche, copo a max
Bourreria pulchra – bakalbo, kakalché, copte ché
Bourreria purpusii – yoa prieto, jazmín del monte
 Bourreria radula (Poir.) G.Don – rough strongbark
Bourreria rekoi
 Bourreria revoluta Kunth
Bourreria rinconensis
Bourreria rowellii
Bourreria rubra
Bourreria sonorae – chocolatillo, lengua de gato
Bourreria spathulata – capulín, zalzapotzin, zapotillo
 Bourreria succulenta Jacq. – bodywood, chink, poisonberry
Bourreria superba – ricate
 Bourreria velutina (DC.) Gurke
 Bourreria virgata (Sw.) G.Don – roble de guayo

References

External links

 
Boraginaceae genera
Taxonomy articles created by Polbot